Szilárd Devecseri (born 13 February 1990) is a Hungarian football player who currently plays for Szombathelyi Haladás.

Club statistics

Updated to games played as of 29 February 2020.

References

External links

HLSZ

1990 births
Living people
Sportspeople from Szombathely
Hungarian footballers
Association football defenders
Szombathelyi Haladás footballers
Mezőkövesdi SE footballers
Zalaegerszegi TE players
Nemzeti Bajnokság I players
Nemzeti Bajnokság II players
Hungary international footballers
Hungary under-21 international footballers